Dallas Convention Center is a DART Light Rail station located in Dallas, Texas. It is located at Memorial Drive and Lamar Street, underneath the Dallas Convention Center in the Convention Center District.

References

External links 
 DART - Convention Center Station

Dallas Area Rapid Transit light rail stations in Dallas
Railway stations in the United States opened in 1996
1996 establishments in Texas
Railway stations in Dallas County, Texas